Ulf Kirsten (born 4 December 1965) is a German former professional footballer who played as a striker. Nicknamed Der Schwatte (dialect for Der Schwarze, 'The Black One'), he is the first player in history to reach a total 100 caps playing with two different national teams (first for East Germany, then Reunified Germany). Kirsten's biggest success was the victory of the 1992–93 DFB-Pokal.

Club career

Dynamo Dresden
Kirsten began playing football for local team BSG Chemie Riesa in 1972. He joined BSG Stahl Riesa in 1978 before joining the youth academy of Dynamo Dresden in 1979. Dynamo Dresden was a center of excellence and the most prominent club in Bezirk Dresden. It was also the most successful club in East Germany at the time. Kirsten made his professional debut for Dynamo Dresden in the 1983-84 DDR-Oberliga season.

Kirsten played 154 matches and scored 57 goals for Dynamo Dresden in the DDR-Oberliga. He won the DDR-Oberliga with Dynamo Dresden in two consecutive seasons: 1988-88 and 1989-90. Kirsten became the Footballer of the Year in East Germany in 1990.

Kirsten had an unusual build: measuring only 172 cm (5'8"), but weighing 81 kg (179 lbs). He therefore had an unusually low centre of gravity, which enabled him to protect the ball in the box against much bigger defenders and turn around quickly for close-range shots. The playing style was often compared to that of Gerd Müller. In addition, despite his small height, Kirsten was also a feared header.

Bayer Leverkusen

Kirsten was one of the first East German footballers to enter the Bundesliga after the German reunification. In the German Bundesliga he played 350 matches for Bayer 04 Leverkusen and scored 182 goals (ranked #7 in the all-time top scorer list). He established himself as one of the most dangerous strikers in the Bundesliga, but Bayer Leverkusen regularly ended as runner-up to either Bayern Munich or Borussia Dortmund. He stayed there until his retirement in 2003. He also played in the 2002 UEFA Champions League Final. In the 1999–2000 season, Kirsten won the EFFIFU award for being the most efficient striker in the league.

Off the pitch, Kirsten was famous for his strong beard growth, which earned him a sponsorship by Braun, who used him to advertise their electrical shavers.

International career

Kirsten's 100 caps are almost evenly split: 49 for East Germany and 51 for the re-unified Germany in a career which spanned 15 years from 1985 until 2000, with the reunified team being formed in late 1990.

Kirsten scored a total of 34 international goals, 14 of them for East Germany. His only major tournaments came late in his career; Kirsten played for his country at the 1994 and 1998 World Cups and Euro 2000.

Personal life
Kirsten's son Benjamin is also a footballer, and has played as a goalkeeper for Dynamo Dresden and NEC.

Along with several other teammates, Kirsten was allegedly implicated as an Stasi informant during his time at Dynamo Dresden files recovered from the security service's archives after the fall of East Germany.

Career statistics

Club

1 Including 1 match and 1 goal in 1993 DFB-Supercup.
2 Including 1 match and 1 goal in 1997 DFB-Ligapokal.
3 Including 2 matches and 1 goal in 1998 DFB-Ligapokal.
4 Including 2 matches and 2 goals in 1999 DFB-Ligapokal.
5 Including 1 match and 1 goal in 2000 DFB-Ligapokal.
6 Including 1 match in 2001 DFB-Ligapokal.
7 Including 1 match in 2002 DFB-Ligapokal.

International

International goals for East Germany
Score and results list East Germany's goal tally first.

International goals for Germany
Score and results list Germany's goal tally first.

Managerial statistics

Honours

Club
Dynamo Dresden
DDR-Oberliga (2): 1988–89, 1989–90
FDGB-Pokal (2): 1984–85, 1989–90

Bayer Leverkusen
DFB-Pokal: 1992–93

Individual
East German Footballer of the Year (1): 1989–90
Bundesliga top scorer (3): 1992–93, 1996–97, 1997–98
UEFA Cup Winners' Cup top scorer (1): 1993–94
UEFA Cup top scorer (1): 1994–95
kicker Bundesliga Team of the Season (2): 1996–97, 1998–99

See also
 List of men's footballers with 100 or more international caps

References

External links

Ulf Kirsten profile at Leverkusen.com 

1965 births
Living people
People from Riesa
German footballers
East German footballers
Footballers from Saxony
Germany international footballers
Association football forwards
Dynamo Dresden players
Dynamo Dresden II players
Bayer 04 Leverkusen players
Kicker-Torjägerkanone Award winners
Bundesliga players
1994 FIFA World Cup players
1998 FIFA World Cup players
UEFA Euro 2000 players
East Germany international footballers
Dual internationalists (football)
FIFA Century Club
German football managers
DDR-Oberliga players
People of the Stasi
People from Bezirk Dresden